The Ultimate Fighter 2 was the second season of the mixed martial arts reality television series The Ultimate Fighter.  The season featured a heavyweight and a welterweight division, with 9 fighters initially in each division. The UFC coaches for this season were welterweight and middleweight champions Matt Hughes and Rich Franklin.  Season 1 coach and former UFC champion Randy Couture hosted and designed the team challenge segments, which if won would allow the winning team to pair a fighter from their team against another in elimination matches. The finale aired on November 5, 2005, and it set a ratings record for the UFC with a 2.0 overall rating. This season featured no coaches' fight because Hughes and Franklin had refused to fight each other, owing to their friendship. Although released on DVD in 2005, it has been set for re-release on September 18, 2007.

For many years, Season 2 was the only season where all fights that took place were considered as professional MMA bouts by the Nevada State Athletic Commission.  However, this has recently been changed and they are now considered to be exhibition bouts.

Cast

Coaches
 Matt Hughes, head coach of blue team
 Rich Franklin, head coach of green team

Fighters
Team Franklin
Welterweights :  Jorge Gurgel, Marcus Davis,  Anthony Torres, Melvin Guillard
Heavyweights :  Keith Jardine, Seth Petruzelli, Rashad Evans, Brad Imes
Team Hughes
Welterweights :  Joe Stevenson, Josh Burkman (Jason Von Flue), Sammy Morgan, Luke Cummo
Heavyweights :  Mike Whitehead, Dan Christison, Rob MacDonald, Tom Murphy
Unassigned
Kenny Stevens,  Kerry Schall, Eli Joslin.

* Burkman was replaced by Von Flue due to injury on episode 2.

Others
Hosts: Dana White, Randy Couture
Narrator: Mike Rowe

Episodes
Episode 1: A New Crop (Original Air Date: August 22, 2005)
Matt Hughes and Rich Franklin are introduced as the new coaches.
Heavyweight Kerry Schall is eliminated due to a knee injury.
Eli Joslin chooses to leave the show, citing his reasons as not being able to handle the camera environment at the house.
Kenny Stevens is chosen as the weakest welterweight and calls out Sammy Morgan to fight.
Stevens forfeits his match saying he will not be able to make weight for the fight.

Episode 2: The Teams Are Picked (Original Air Date: August 29, 2005)
Dan Christison joins the show to replace the injured Schall.
A coin is flipped and Franklin chose to pick the first fighter.

Team Hughes wins the welterweight challenge.
Josh Burkman defeated Melvin Guillard by unanimous decision after three rounds.

Episode 3: No Pain, No Grain (Original Air Date: September 5, 2005)
Josh Burkman is forced to leave the competition after breaking his arm in the match with Melvin Guillard.
Rob MacDonald complains about his shoulder which he claims he injured very badly. His constant complaining upsets Team Hughes, especially Hughes himself.
Jason Von Flue joins the show to replace Burkman.
Team Hughes wins the heavyweight challenge.
Brad Imes defeated Rob MacDonald by submission (triangle choke) at 4:07 of the first round.

Episode 4: Strategy (Original Air Date: September 12, 2005)
Team Franklin wins the welterweight challenge.
Joe Stevenson defeated Marcus Davis by submission (elbows) at 4:10 of the first round.

Episode 5: Leave It In The Octagon (Original Air Date: September 19, 2005)
Team Hughes wins the heavyweight challenge.
Rashad Evans defeated Tom Murphy by unanimous decision after three rounds.
Evans causes controversy by "showboating" (dancing around in the octagon) at various stages of the fight, much to the chagrin of opposing coach Hughes.  White states that this was one of the more boring fights he has seen.

Episode 6: Slugfest (Original Air Date: September 26, 2005)
Hughes expresses disgust at Rashad Evans' actions in the octagon during the previous episode.
Evans laments that Hughes was someone that he once respected and quotes Bernie Mac's "be yourself" line from House Party 3.
Team Hughes wins the welterweight scarecrow challenge after the green team forfeits to save their fighters.
Jason Von Flue defeated Jorge Gurgel by unanimous decision after three rounds.

Episode 7: No Respect (Original Air Date: October 3, 2005)
Hughes does not seem to care about Jason Von Flue winning his fight with Gurgel and is even playing cards in the locker room while the doctors look at Von Flue. 
Matt Hughes says in an interview that even if Von Flue had lost, he would not have cared or considered it a loss.
Team Franklin wins the heavyweight mud wrestling challenge.
After receiving stitches from his fight, Von Flue does not receive any congrats from Team Hughes when he returns to the house.
Hughes sends Von Flue over to Team Franklin for reshuffling.
Von Flue is upset about this, especially because he won his fight, and curses Hughes.
Seth Petruzelli defeated Dan Christison by unanimous decision after three rounds.

Episode 8: Knees And Elbows (Original Air Date: October 10, 2005)
Team Hughes wins the welterweight "Randy Says" challenge after Jason Von Flue and Anthony Torres fail to obey Couture's directions.
Franklin sends Brad Imes to Team Hughes for reshuffling.
Luke Cummo defeated Anthony Torres by unanimous decision after three rounds.

Episode 9: Mental Game (Original Air Date: October 17, 2005)
Team Hughes wins the heavyweight challenge resoundingly.
Brad Imes is passed over for a fight due to a cut over his eye received in training, so Whitehead is chosen to fight instead.
Rashad Evans defeats Mike Whitehead by unanimous decision after three rounds. 
The fight leaves the blue team, Hughes, and White shocked due to Whitehead's lackluster effort. White says that he choked "To the point where there is 10 seconds left and he just stops fighting, I've never seen that."

Episode 10: Killer Instinct (Original Air Date: October 24, 2005)
 After his loss to Rashad Evans, Mike Whitehead tells his team that he is done fighting. White asks him what happened because Whitehead was the favorite to win the whole thing and he simply replies "I guess I'm not a fighter."
Jason Von Flue sustains a cut between the eyes in practice, so Marcus Davis is brought back as an alternate in the case of Von Flue being unable to fight.
The rest of the matches are set up by White, Franklin, and Hughes with input from fighters; the matches are: Cummo against Morgan, Joe Stevenson against Von Flue, Brad Imes vs. Seth Petruzelli, and Evans against Keith Jardine.
Luke Cummo defeated Sammy Morgan by KO (knee) at 2:05 of the second round.

Episode 11: Heavyweight Semi-Final (Original Air Date: 31 October 2005)
Rashad Evans defeated Keith Jardine by unanimous decision after three rounds.

Episode 12: Semi-Finals Countdown (Original Air Date: November 1, 2005)
Von Flue is cleared by the doctors to fight.
Joe Stevenson defeated Jason Von Flue by submission (armbar) at 4:46 of the first round. 
Stevenson and Luke Cummo will face each other in the final for UFC contract.
Brad Imes defeated Seth Petruzelli by split decision after three rounds. 
White believes that Imes did enough to win and believes that this split decision should have been unanimous.
Petruzelli suffers extensive damage to his right ear and Imes will face Rashad Evans in the finale.
In an interesting note, even though Cummo and Imes were both the last picked for their respective divisions, they both made it to the finale.

Welterweight bracket

Heavyweight bracket

Legend

The Ultimate Fighter 2 Finale

The Ultimate Fighter: Team Hughes vs. Team Franklin Finale (also known as The Ultimate Fighter 2 Finale) was a mixed martial arts event held by the Ultimate Fighting Championship (UFC) on November 5, 2005. Featured were the finals from The Ultimate Fighter 2 in both the Welterweight and Heavyweight divisions as well as a main event between Diego Sanchez and Nick Diaz.

Results

See also 
 Ultimate Fighting Championship
 List of UFC champions
 List of UFC events
 2005 in UFC

References

2005 American television seasons
2005 in mixed martial arts
The Ultimate Fighter episodes